The Ho-Am Art Museum (in Korean: 호암미술관) is an art museum in Yongin, Gyeonggi-do, South Korea, approximately 40 km south of Seoul.
It holds a number of traditional Korean paintings.

The museum was built in 1982 by Samsung and named after their former chairman, Lee Byung-chul. Ho-Am is his pen name which means filling up a space with clear water as lakes do, and being unshakeable as a large rock. It is located in the Everland Resort. The museum includes a re-created Korean traditional garden, known as the Hee Won Garden.

See also
 Korean art
 List of museums in South Korea

References

External links

 

Everland Resort
Art museums established in 1982
Art museums and galleries in South Korea
Biographical museums in South Korea
Gardens in South Korea
Buildings and structures in Yongin
Samsung
1982 establishments in South Korea
Museums in Gyeonggi Province
20th-century architecture in South Korea